Before You Go is a 1968 comedy play by Lawrence Holofcener about the relationship between an actress and a sculptor.

The critic from Time magazine praised the play, saying that :
The two character man-woman play is now a Broadway staple. Lawrence Holofcener's Before You Go ranks with Two for the Seesaw and The Owl and the Pussycat as the best of the genre. Wry, perceptive, honest, sad, funny and tender, it is compassionately discerning about two people who are not quite wise to themselves.|The critic from the New York Times was less enthusiastic but said the play "unwinds pleasantly enough." The play did not enjoy a long run. It was produced in London in 1969 and Washington in 1970.

The play was profiled in the William Goldman book The Season: A Candid Look at Broadway.

References

External links

1968 plays
Comedy plays